ClO3 may refer to:

The chlorate anion, ClO3-
Monochlorine trioxide, a hypothetical radical akin to chlorine dioxide
The empirical formula for dichlorine hexoxide / chloryl perchlorate
The perchloryl cation, ClO3+